The women's single sculls competition at the 2013 Summer Universiade in Kazan took place the Kazan Rowing Centre.

Results

Heats

Heat 1

Heat 2

Repechage

Finals

Final B

Final A

References 

Women's rowing at the 2013 Summer Universiade